Cumberland County Cricket Club played 23 List A cricket matches between 1984 and 2003. The following players appeared for them during those matches.

List of players
 James Anyon, 1 match, 2003
 Asim Munir, 1 match, 2002
 Ian Austin, 1 match, 2002
 Eldine Baptiste, 1 match, 1994
 David Barnes (cricketer), 1 match, 2003
 Paul Beech, 4 matches, 1996–1999
 Paul Berry, 1 match, 1995
 Neil Boustead, 3 matches, 1984–1986
 James Bruce, 1 match, 2001
 Mark Burns, 2 matches, 2002
 Grahame Clarke, 7 matches, 1985–1997
 Charles Dagnall, 1 match, 1998
 David Drury, 1 match, 1985
 Simon Dutton, 15 matches, 1987–2001
 John Elleray, 2 matches, 1985–1986
 Richard Ellwood, 4 matches, 1989–1995
 Robert Entwistle, 1 match, 1984
 Jonathan Fielding, 11 matches, 1996–2001
 Dexter Fitton, 1 match, 1994
 John Glendenen, 5 matches, 1999–2000
 David Halliwell, 6 matches, 1984–1989
 Kevin Hayes, 2 matches, 1988–1989
 Dean Hodgson, 2 matches, 1986–1987
 Stuart Horne, 1 match, 2001
 Quentin Hughes, 1 match, 2003
 Terry Hunte, 4 matches, 1992–2001
 Michael Ingham, 1 match, 1996
 Christopher Kippax, 1 match, 2002
 Simon Kippax, 5 matches, 1995–2000
 Colin Knight, 1 match, 1992
 Steven Knox, 13 matches, 1996–2002
 Pallav Kumar, 1 match, 2003
 Peter Lawson, 3 matches, 2001–2002
 Martin Lewis, 9 matches, 1999–2002
 David Lloyd, 2 matches, 1984–1985
 Graham Lloyd, 1 match, 2003
 David Lupton, 1 match, 1984
 David Makinson, 3 matches, 1992–1995
 John Mason, 2 matches, 2001–2002
 Robert Mason, 2 matches, 2002–2003
 Andrew Mawson, 3 matches, 1996–1998
 Ashley Metcalfe, 10 matches, 1998–2003
 Graham Monkhouse, 1 match, 1987
 James Moyes, 1 match, 2001
 John Moyes, 6 matches, 1984–1989
 Steve O'Shaughnessy, 12 matches, 1994–2003
 David Parsons, 1 match, 1984
 Dipak Patel, 1 match, 1995
 David Pearson, 10 matches, 1994–2000
 David Pennett, 11 matches, 1997–2002
 Simon Philbrook, 1 match, 1986
 Thomas Prime, 2 matches, 2001
 Qasim Umar, 2 matches, 1984–1985
 Bernard Reidy, 6 matches, 1984–1989
 David Rooney, 1 match, 2003
 Kevin Sample, 3 matches, 1985–1992
 Michael Scothern, 6 matches, 1988–1997
 Marcus Sharp, 16 matches, 1994–2003
 Steven Sharp, 6 matches, 1986–1994
 David Smith, 1 match, 1994
 Robert Smith, 1 match, 2001
 Christopher Stockdale, 5 matches, 1986–1992
 Simon Twigg, 2 matches, 2002
 Stephen Wall, 3 matches, 1987–1989
 David Wheatman, 4 matches, 2000–2001
 Gareth White, 1 match, 2002
 A.S. Williams, 1 match, 2001
 Dean Williams, 2 matches, 2001–2003
 Alan Wilson, 1 match, 1984
 Andrew Wilson, 1 match, 1996
 Malcolm Woods, 7 matches, 1984–1992

References
 

Cumbria County Cricket Club
Cumberland